

Archosauromorphs

Newly named dinosaurs
Data courtesy of George Olshevsky's dinosaur genera list.

Sauropterygians
 Plesiosaur gastroliths documented.

Newly named plesiosaurs

Synapsids

Non-mammalian

Eutherians

Cetaceans

Pholidotes

References

 Sanders F, Manley K, Carpenter K. Gastroliths from the Lower Cretaceous sauropod Cedarosaurus weiskopfae. In: Tanke D.H, Carpenter K, editors. Mesozoic vertebrate life: new research inspired by the paleontology of Philip J. Currie. Indiana University Press; Bloomington, IN: 2001. pp. 166–180.
 Williston, Samuel Wendel; 1903. North American Plesiosaurs; Field Columbian Museum Publication 73, Geological Series; II(I); Field Columbian Museum, Chicago.